Massacre is a 1934 American drama film directed by Alan Crosland. The film stars Richard Barthelmess and Ann Dvorak as its Native American protagonists, and also features Charles Middleton, Sidney Toler, Claire Dodd and Clarence Muse.

Plot

Chief Joe Thunderhorse (Barthelmess) is the star of a wild west show at the Century of Progress in Chicago. Though he is the authentic son of a Native American chief, he has lived away from the reservation so long that he has lost all personal connection to them. His ethnic authenticity and physical prowess are exploited by white showmen. His rich white girlfriend (Dodd) flaunts him in front of her curious friends.  

Joe and his valet (Muse) travel to the reservation where he grew up upon hearing that his father Black Pony is on his death bed. His dying father no longer recognizes him. The terrible living conditions to which Joe's people are subjected to at the hands of white government agents are also revealed to him. Upon the death of his father, Joe's sister Jennie is raped by a government agent and, with the assistance of a college-educated reservation resident named Lydia (Dvorak), Joe decides to take action.

Cast

See also
Pre-Code Hollywood

References

External links 
 

1934 films
American drama films
Films directed by Alan Crosland
Films about Native Americans
1934 drama films
Warner Bros. films
First National Pictures films
American black-and-white films
Films set in Chicago
1930s American films
Films scored by Bernhard Kaun
Century of Progress
Films about rape in the United States